O'Higgins was a Chilean frigate famous for her actions under Captain Lord Cochrane.

Russian career
The ship was launched in Russia in 1816, as the Speshni-class frigate Patrikii ("Патрикий"). To save time and money, the Russians built her of pine and larch. In 1817 the Russians sold her to Spain, which renamed her María Isabel.

Spanish career
In 1818 María Isabel sailed under Captain Dionisio Capas with a convoy to the coast of Peru. There the First Chilean Navy Squadron, under the command of Manuel Blanco Encalada, captured her at Talcahuano.

Chilean career
The Chileans renamed the ship O'Higgins after Bernardo O'Higgins, the South American Independence leader and first Chilean head of state. 

O'Higgins was Thomas Cochrane's flagship when he commanded the Chilean navy during the Freedom Expedition of Perú. 

When San Martín was wrecked in the bay of Chorrilos, Peru, in July 1821, Cochrane shifted his flag from San Martín back to O'Higgins. 

Cochrane also sailed O'Higgins to Acapulco.

On 8 June 1823, O'Higgins suffered severe damage when she collided with the Chilean ship  in the Bay of Paraíso during a gale.

During 1823, after a conservative coup on 28 January 1823 deposed O'Higgins, the new government under Ramón Freire renamed the frigate María Isabel again.

Argentine career
She was sold to Argentina on 1 April 1826 and refitted in Valparaíso and renamed Buenos Aires, but she never reached Buenos Aires. She sank rounding Cape Horn.

See also 
 List of decommissioned ships of the Chilean Navy

Citations

External links
 Historical Text Archive, Chile: A Brief Naval History

Frigates of the Spanish Navy
Sailing frigates of the Chilean Navy
First Chilean Navy Squadron
Shipwrecks in the Chilean Sea
Maritime incidents in 1826
Maritime incidents in Chile
1816 ships
Ships built in Russia